Sudheesh (born 7 December 1972) is an Indian actor and director from Calicut who predominantly works in Malayalam film industry. He won Kerala State Film Awards for Best Character Actor in 2021.

Personal life

Sudheesh is the only son of T. Sudhakaran Nair and Suryaprabha. Sudhakaran Nair was a retired deputy collector and an actor who performed notable roles in films such as Gulmohar, Khaki, Bharatham, Sadayam, Pattabhishekam, Indian rupee etc. The father-son duo has acted together in many films. Similarly, Sudheesh's son Rudraksh Nair has acted as child hero in the film Kochavva Paulo Ayyappa Coelho. 
Sudheesh did his schooling from St. Joseph's Boys' Higher Secondary School, Kozhikode and higher studies in St. Joseph's College, Devagiri. Sudheesh married Dhanya on 30 March 2005. They have two sons. His father died on 4 January 2016 aged 73.

Filmography

1980s

1990s

2000s

2010s

2020s

as dubbing artist

Awards

Television career

References

External links

Sudheesh at MSI
Association of Malayalam Movies Artistes (AMMA)
Sudheesh(Actor) OneIndia Popcorn
Sudheesh(Actor) Fan Blog
Sudheesh Malayalam Actor

Male actors from Kozhikode
Male actors in Malayalam cinema
Indian male film actors
Living people
1975 births
20th-century Indian male actors
21st-century Indian male actors
Indian male television actors
Male actors in Hindi television
Indian male child actors